Euchromius cornus is a moth in the family Crambidae. It was described by Schouten in 1990. It is found in Australia, where it has been recorded from most provinces, including Western Australia.

References

Crambinae
Moths described in 1990
Moths of Australia